Jean-Claude Larrieu may refer to:
Jean-Claude Larrieu (cinematographer), French cinematographer
Jean-Claude Larrieu (footballer) (born 1946), French football player